The following is a list of the television networks and announcers who have broadcast college football's Mountain West Conference Football Championship Game.

Television

Radio

Broadcasters
CBS Sports
Mountain West